Longmore may refer to:

People

 Andrew Longmore (b. 1944), a British lawyer and judge
 Andrew Longmore (journalist) (1953–2019), English cricketer and journalist
 Arthur Longmore (1885-1970), an early British naval aviator and later a senior Royal Air Force officer
 Dave Longmore (b. ?), a British musician and member of The Str8jackets
 Greg Longmore  (b. 1972), international risk consultant 
 Keith Longmore  (b. 1956), journalist and publisher 
 Michael Longmore (b. 1979), an English cricketer
 Paul K. Longmore (1946-2010), an American college professor, author, and disability activist
 Roy Longmore (1894-2001), an Australian centenarian and World War I veteran, and one of the last two living veterans of the Australia and New Zealand Army Corps
 Saphire Longmore (born 1976), Jamaican politician and former model

Other

 77P/Longmore, a comet
 Longmore House, a hospital in Scotland